The Embassy of Mexico in France, based out of Paris, is the primary diplomatic mission from the United Mexican States to France. It also represents Mexico to the Principality of Monaco, as well as to the Council of Europe.

Location 
The chancery for the Embassy is located at 9, rue de Longchamp in Paris. Additionally, the Consular Section is located at 4, rue Nôtre Dame des Victoires. Finally, Mexico also maintains a Cultural Institute at 119, rue Vieille du Temple.

Ambassadors 
The Ambassador of Mexico to the France is the highest ranking diplomatic representative of the United Mexican States to the French Republic and subsequently holds the rank of "ambassador extraordinary and plenipotentiary." The following is a list of Mexican ambassadors since the presidency of Vicente Fox Quesada:

 Under President Vicente Fox Quesada (2000 – 2006)
 2001 – 2007: Claude Heller Rouassant
 Under President Felipe Calderon (2006 – 2012)
 2007: Mabel del Pilar Gómez Oliver
 2007 – 2012: Carlos Alberto de Icaza González
 Under President Enrique Peña Nieto (2012 – 2018)
 2013 – 2016: Agustín García-López Loaeza
 2016 – 2018: Juan Manuel Gómez Robledo
 Under President Andrés Manuel López Obrador (2018 – Present)
 2018 – 2021: Juan Manuel Gómez Robledo
 2021 – Present: Blanca Elena Jiménez Cisneros

Embassy sections 
The Embassy exercises a number of functions in its representation to the Government of the France, including political, administrative, economic, public diplomacy, and consular affairs, that are managed by officials from the Secretariat of Foreign Affairs. The difference sections of the Embassy are as follow:

 Office of the Ambassador
 Office of the chief of the chancellery
 Office for political affairs
 Office for scientific, technical and university cooperation 
 Office for economic affairs
 Office for press and communication
 Office for cultural affairs
 Office for judicial affairs
 Military attaché
 Naval attaché
 Office for representation before the Council of Europe
 Mexican Cultural Institute

Honorary consulates 
In addition to the consular section in Paris, the Embassy also maintains honorary consulates throughout France, as well as in Monaco. These honorary consulates serve various functions. They work to:

 Try to maintain a good image of Mexico, and its people, in France by providing clarification on certain matters and issues
 Promote academic and cultural exchanges between local French organizations and Mexico
 Represent Mexico in formal and private events, as well as before French governmental institutions, in which it is important that Mexico have a presence
 Provide assistance and guidance to Mexican entrepreneurs who may be visiting France, as well as request information for these entrepreneurs if required
 Disseminate information about Mexico's current affairs, institutions and foreign policy to the local population
 Maintain contact with Mexican students in their locality, as well as to try to meet their needs and provide support when required
 Collaborate with the Embassy and Consular Section in Paris to coordinate official visits from Mexican officials when the Mexican Government requests support for such visitors
 Inform the local population, and foreigners alike, about Mexican affairs that may be causing concern or confusion.

All of the honorary consulates are manages by the Embassy in Paris, which acts as their supervisory office. 

They are located in the following cities:

 Barcelonnette
 Bordeaux
 Dijon
 Le Havre
 Lyon
 Marseille
 Toulouse
 Fort-de-France
 Monte Carlo, Monaco

Other diplomatic missions in France

Separately, Mexico has the following diplomatic missions in France: 

 Permanent Mission of Mexico to the Organisation for Economic Co-operation and Development in Paris.
 Permanent Mission of Mexico to UNESCO in Paris.
 Liaison office of Mexico to the Council of Europe in Strasbourg.

See also 
 France–Mexico relations
 Foreign relations of Mexico
 List of diplomatic missions of Mexico

References

External links 
 Official website

Paris
Mexico
Mexican Embassy